Hires is a surname. Notable people with the surname include:
Charles Elmer Hires (1851–1937), American pharmacist
Chryssandra Hires (born 1966), American handball player
George Hires (1835–1911), American politician
Justin Hires (born 1985), American comedian and actor
Matt Hires  (born 1985), American singer-songwriter

See also
Hire (surname)